Margarita Engle (born in Los Angeles, California on September 2, 1951) is a Cuban American poet and author of many award-winning books for children, young adults and adults.  Most of Engle's stories are written in verse and are a reflection of her Cuban heritage and her deep appreciation and knowledge of nature. She became the first Latino awarded a Newbery Honor in 2009 for The Surrender Tree: Poems of Cuba's Struggle for Freedom. She was selected by the Poetry Foundation to serve from 2017 to 2019 as the sixth Young People's Poet Laureate. On October 9, 2018, Margarita Engle was announced the winner of the 2019 NSK Neustadt Prize for Children's Literature. She was nominated by 2019 NSK Prize jury member Lilliam Rivera.

Early life
Engle's father was born in Los Angeles, California and her mother in Trinidad, Cuba. Although Engle was born and raised in California, growing up, she spent many summers with her extended family in Cuba. As a child, she was introduced to poetry in Spanish, particularly the works of José Martí.

Career 
Engle earned a B.S. from California State Polytechnic University  in 1974, an M.S. from Iowa State University in 1977, and nearly completed a doctoral degree in biology from the University of California, Riverside in 1983.  Before starting her writing career, Engle was a tenured professor of agronomy at California Polytechnic University.  While working on her doctoral degree, she took a seminar in creative writing with Tomás Rivera, and credits this experience with igniting her passion to write.  She lives in Central California, where she enjoys helping her husband with his volunteer work for wilderness search and rescue dog training programs.

Awards
Entire body of work (2019)
NSK Neustadt Prize for Children's Literature

THE POET SLAVE OF CUBA, A Biography of Juan Francisco Manzano (Henry Holt & Co., 2006)
2008 Pura Belpré Medal for author
2006 Américas Award winner 
International Reading Association Teachers' Choice
ALA Best Books for Young Adults
NCTE Notable Children's Books in the Language Arts
Bank Street

THE SURRENDER TREE, Poems of Cuba's Struggle for Freedom (Henry Holt & Co., 2008)
 2009 Newbery Honor
 2009 Pura Belpré Medal for author
 2009 Américas Award winner 
 Jane Addams Children's Book Award for book for older children
 Claudia Lewis Poetry Award
 Lee Bennett Hopkins Honor
 ALA Best Books for Young Adults
 ALA Notable Book
 NCSS-CBC Notable Social Studies Book
 Amelia Bloomer Book
 Booklist Editors Choice
 Kansas State Reading Circle
 Michigan Great Lakes Great Books Award Master List
 Junior Library Guild Selection

TROPICAL SECRETS, Holocaust Refugees in Cuba (Henry Holt & Co., 2009)
2010 Sydney Taylor Book Award
Paterson Prize
2010 Américas Award Commendation 
New York Public Library 100 Titles for Reading and Sharing
ALA Best Books for Young Adults Nominee
California Teachers Association Recommended Book

THE FIREFLY LETTERS, A Suffragette's Journey to Cuba (Henry Holt & Co., 2010)
2011 Pura Belpré Honor for author
2011 Américas Award Honor 
Jane Addams Award Finalist
California Book Award Finalist
International Reading Association Notable Book for a Global Society
NCSS-CBC Notable Social Studies Book
Amelia Bloomer Book
TAYSHAS Choice
Junior Library Guild Selection

SUMMER BIRDS, The Butterflies of Maria Merian (Henry Holt & Co., 2010, picture book)
2012 Américas Award winner 
Kirkus Best Books for Children
NCSS-CBC Notable Social Studies Book
Amelia Bloomer Book

HURRICANE DANCERS, The First Caribbean Pirate Shipwreck (Henry Holt & Co., 2011)
2012 Pura Belpré Honor for author
ALSC 2012 Notable Children's Book for older readers
ALA Best Books for Young Adults nominee
Poetry for Children Blog's Top 20 Most Distinctive Books of Poetry 2011
2012 White Ravens List

DRUM DREAM GIRL,  (Houghton Mifflin Harcourt., 2015)
2016 Charlotte Zolotow Award
2016 Américas Award Commendation 

ENCHANTED AIR: TWO CULTURES, TWO WINGS: A MEMOIR  (Simon and Schuster., 2015)
2016 Pura Belpré Medal for author
2016 Américas Award Commendation 
FOREST WORLD  (Simon and Schuster., 2017)

 CBC/NCSS Notable Social Studies Trade Book
 2018 Green Earth Book Award
 Kansas NEA Reading Circle List Intermediate Title
 Walter Dean Myers Honor Book

Selected works
"Archetype"; "Memory"; "Variations on a Theme", Terrain.org
Singing to Cuba, Arte Publico Press, 1993, 
Skywriting, Bantam Books, 1995, 
 The Poet Slave of Cuba, a Biography of Juan Francisco Manzano (Henry Holt & Co., April, 2006) 
 The Surrender Tree (Holt, 2008) 
Tropical Secrets: Holocaust Refugees in Cuba, Macmillan, 2009, 
The Firefly Letters: A Suffragette's Journey to Cuba, Henry Holt & Co., 2010, 
Summer Birds: The Butterflies of Maria Merian, Henry Holt & Co., 2010, 
Hurricane Dancers The First Caribbean Pirate Shipwreck, Henry Holt & Co., 2011, 
The Wild Book, Houghton Mifflin Harcourt, 2012, 
When You Wander, Henry Holt and Co., 2013, 
The Lightning Dreamer, Houghton Mifflin Harcourt, 201, 
Mountain Dog, Henry Holt and Co., 2013, 
Orangutanka: A Story in Poems, Henry Holt and Co., 2015, 
Drum Dream Girl, Houghton Mifflin Harcourt, 2015,
Enchanted Air: Two Cultures, Two Wings: A Memoir, Simon and Schuster, 2015,
Lion Island: Cuba's Warrior of Words, Simon and Schuster, 2017 
 Dreams from Many Rivers, Henry Holt and Co., 2019 
 Jazz Owls: A Novel of the Zoot Suit Riots, Atheneum Books for Young Readers, 2019

See also

 Cuban American literature
 List of Cuban-American writers

References

External links
 
"Q & A with Margarita Engle",  Publishers Weekly, Aida Bardales, 4/16/2009
"Margarita Engle's Historic Newbery Honor", School Library Journal, Debra Lau Whelan, 3/4/2009
"Guanabee Interviews Margarita Engle, Newbery Honor-Winning Author Of The Surrender Tree", Guanabee, Alejandra Alvarez, 2/23/2009
"Yuyi Morales, Margarita Engle win Pura Belpré Awards", American Library Association, 1/26/2009
 

1951 births
American children's writers
California State Polytechnic University, Pomona faculty
Writers from Los Angeles
Living people
21st-century American botanists
American people of Cuban descent
Newbery Honor winners
American women scientists
American women poets
21st-century American novelists
21st-century American women writers
American women children's writers
American women novelists
21st-century American poets
21st-century American women scientists